Flamingo Gardens is a , is a botanical garden and wildlife sanctuary, located just west of Fort Lauderdale, Florida and north of Miami at 3750 South Flamingo Road, Davie, Florida, United States. It is open to the public for a fee.

History
The Gardens, a tropical oasis in South Florida, were originally the property of Floyd L. and Jane Wray, who in 1927 built a weekend home, citrus grove and laboratory on what was then the edge of the Everglades, where they started a botanical collection of rare and unusual tropicals and subtropical exotics, fruit trees and specimens collected from around the world. The non-profit Floyd L. Wray Memorial Foundation was established to preserve the property and its gardens for future generations. The Wray Home is now a museum illustrating a country home in the early 1930s. Guided tours are provided daily.

Collection

Plants
The grounds contain more than 3,000 species of tropical and subtropical plants, including 200-year-old Southern live oaks, and 300 plus species of palms. A narrated tram ride leads through the site's tropical rainforest, native hammock, wetland areas and exotic flora. The gardens are home to nationally noted collections of heliconias, gingers, calatheas, bromeliads, flowering trees, palms, crotons, aroids, succulents, orchids, ferns and cycads as well as a mango orchard, and pollinator's garden. On the grounds is a jungle-like arboretum featuring 16 Champion trees, many the largest in the state or the country including a massive Enterlobium cyclocarpum (Ear Tree). The arboretum contains one of the largest collection of non-indigenous champion trees in the region. Among the specimens include pink trumpet tree, yellow poinciana, dynamite tree, Indian jujube, bread nut tree, wampi, and white sapote among others. The Xeriscape Garden demonstrates low maintenance, minimally-watered gardening.

Animals
Fauna include American flamingos, an American black bear, North American river otters, American alligators, bobcats, Florida panthers, turtles, fish crows, bald eagles, owls and other birds of prey. Additionally, exotic species like African spurred tortoises, keel-billed toucans, parrots and macaws are kept.

The  Everglades aviary houses one of the largest collections of birds and animals in the United States. Species include American white pelicans, brown pelicans, wood storks, American white ibises, roseate spoonbills, great blue herons, black-crowned night herons, fulvous whistling ducks, anhinga, double-crested cormorants and laughing gulls. The aviary exhibits four native Florida ecosystems; coastal prairie, mangrove swamp, sub-tropical hardwood hammock and sawgrass marsh.

See also 
 List of botanical gardens in the United States

References

External links

Article about the Walking Map of the gardens

Aviaries in the United States
Botanical gardens in Florida
Davie, Florida
Education in Broward County, Florida
Historic house museums in Florida
Landmarks in Florida
Museums in Broward County, Florida
Protected areas of Broward County, Florida
Tourist attractions in Broward County, Florida
1933 establishments in Florida